Potlatch is the second album by Native American rock band Redbone.

Track listing

Personnel
 Lolly Vegas – guitar (Leslie), vocals
 Tony Bellamy – guitar (Wah-Wah), vocals
 Patrick Vegas – bass, vocals
 Peter DePoe – drums, percussion

Charts

1970 albums
Redbone (band) albums
Epic Records albums